Phalonidia olivogrisea is a species of moth of the family Tortricidae. It is found in Peru.

The wingspan is about 27 mm. The ground colour of the forewings is whitish, preserved in the form of broad postmedian interfascia and subapical interfascia. The proximal two-thirds of the wing is olive grey. The hindwings are grey, becoming darker on the periphery.

Etymology
The species name refers to the colouration of the forewings and is derived from Latin oliva (meaning olive) and grisea (meaning grey).

References

Moths described in 2010
Phalonidia